Dawkinsia is a genus of cyprinid fishes from freshwater in South India and Sri Lanka. It was split off from genus Puntius in 2012.

Etymology 
Dawkinsia is named after the evolutionary biologist Richard Dawkins in recognition of his "contribution to the public understanding of science, particularly, of evolutionary science". Dawkins describes this as "a great honour".

Description
Adults typically measure  SL. They do not have rostral barbels but might have maxillary barbels. Juveniles have a colour pattern consisting of three black bars on body; this persists to adult stage in some species. Adults have a black, horizontally elongate blotch on the caudal
peduncle .Found in western ghats.

Species

There are currently nine recognized species in this genus:
 Dawkinsia arulius (Jerdon, 1849) (Arulius barb)
 Dawkinsia assimilis (Jerdon, 1849) 
 Dawkinsia exclamatio (Pethiyagoda & Kottelat, 2005)
 Dawkinsia filamentosa (Valenciennes, 1844) (Blackspot/Filament barb)
 Dawkinsia rohani (Rema Devi, Indra & Knight, 2010)
 Dawkinsia rubrotinctus (Jerdon, 1849)
 Dawkinsia singhala (Duncker, 1912)
 Dawkinsia srilankensis (Senanayake, 1985) (Blotched filamented barb)
 Dawkinsia tambraparniei (Silas, 1954)
 Dawkinsia uttara (Unmesh Katwate, Deepak Apte, Rajeev Raghavan 2020) 
 Dawkinsia apsara (Katwate, Marcus Knight, Anoop, Raghavan & Dahanukar, 2020) (mascara barb)

References

 
Freshwater fish of Asia
Taxa named by Rohan Pethiyagoda
Taxa named by Madhava Meegaskumbura
Taxa named by Kalana Maduwage